{{Album ratings
|rev1 = Amplifier New Zealand
|rev1score = (favourable)<ref name="amp">{{cite web|url=http://www.amplifier.co.nz/review/18280/alphrisk-the-best-kept-secret.html|title=Review: Alphrisk - The Best Kept Secret|last=Fallon|first=Rachel|publisher=Amplifier NZ|accessdate=20 August 2009}}</ref>
}}The Best Kept Secret is the debut solo album of New Zealand hip-hop artist, Alphrisk, of the Deceptikonz released in 2004. It contained the single Sunshine'', which peaked in the New Zealand Singles Chart at number 8.

Track listing 
 "Fifteen Islands"
 "Guess Who's Here"
 "Capital SA" featuring Savage
 "Move Forward"
 "Sunshine" featuring Adeaze
 "I Think I Found Her"
 "The A-Men"
 "Fo’ Sho’" featuring Scram Jones and Mareko
 "Hands Up"
 "My People" featuring Mareko
 "The Circus" featuring Deceptikonz and Breakinwreckwordz
 "The Best Kept Secret"

References 

Hip hop albums by New Zealand artists
2004 debut albums